María Cristina Sangri Aguilar (1 January 1941 – 15 January 2022) was a Mexican politician.

Biography
A member of the Institutional Revolutionary Party, she served in the Chamber of Deputies and Senate from 1985 to 1991. Before that, she served in the Congress of Quintana Roo and was the first female municipal president in the state. She died in Chetumal on 15 January 2022, at the age of 81.

References

1941 births
2022 deaths
Institutional Revolutionary Party politicians
People from Chetumal, Quintana Roo
Politicians from Quintana Roo
Women mayors of places in Mexico
Municipal presidents in Quintana Roo
20th-century Mexican politicians
20th-century Mexican women politicians
Members of the Chamber of Deputies (Mexico)
Women members of the Chamber of Deputies (Mexico)
Members of the Senate of the Republic (Mexico)
Women members of the Senate of the Republic (Mexico)
Members of the Congress of Quintana Roo